Khaled Al Khamissi born September 27, 1962 is an Egyptian novelist, columnist and cultural activist. 

Chevalier de l’Ordre des Arts et des Lettres, France (2021).  

Member of the Parliament for Writers from the Mediterranean (PEM).

Biography
Khaled Al Khamissi was born to Egyptian actress Faten El Choubachi and poet Abdel Rahman Al Khamissi (Lenin Peace Prize 1979). Upon his mother's death when he was five, Al Khamissi was raised by his maternal grandfather Moufid El Choubachi, also a poet, writer and critic. He grew up in a book-lined home, where politics, literature and art were constantly discussed. 

He obtained his bachelor's degree in political science from Cairo University in 1984 and his masters in International Politics from the Sorbonne University in 1987.

His three fiction works, Taxi, Noah’s Ark and Al Shamandar (translated in French as Moi, étoile filante) have provided Arabic and non-Arabic readers with insight into Egyptian society in the last decade. His first non fiction book 2011 was published in 2014. As a columnist, his articles in Egypt and abroad show a blend of his background as a political analyst and fiction writer.

He has been a jury member in a number of film festivals, and Chairman of the board of the Greater Cairo public Library since 2014. He regularly delivers lectures in international universities and book fairs on literature and film.

A believer that cultural progress is the necessary precursor to social change, following the Egyptian revolution of 2011, Al Khamissi set up  Doum, a cultural foundation designed to  promote critical thinking.

He is founder and president of story telling festival in Qena and founder and president of literary festival in Mansoura.

His novels have been translated into 20 languages including:  English, French, Italian, Spanish, German, Turkish, Korean, Polish, Greek, Kurdish and others.

In 2021 the French government named Al Khamissi Chevalier de l’Ordre des Arts et des Lettres.

Books
 Taxi (2007)
 Noah's Ark (2009)
 2011 (2014)
 Al Shamandar (2018) - published in French as Moi, étoile filante (2021).

References

External links
 Global Observatory Interview with Khaled Al-Khamissi, November 2011
http://www.thenational.ae/arts-culture/books/egyptian-author-gives-fuel-for-thought
http://www.hindustantimes.com/kolkata/there-won-t-be-another-tahrir-sq-revolution-in-the-near-future-khaled-al-khamissi/story-EfCZzINcLt828WULfx1RdO.html
https://www.theguardian.com/books/2011/nov/01/taxi-khaled-alkhamissi-review

1962 births
Living people
Egyptian writers